John Rolleston is the name of:

 John Davy Rolleston (1873–1946), English physician and folklorist
 John Rolleston (British politician) (1848–1919)
 John Rolleston (New Zealand politician) (1877–1956)